Thomas Bunn (16 May 1830 – 11 April 1875) was a Métis lawyer, farmer, and politician in Manitoba. He represented St. Clements from 1870 to 1874 in the Legislative Assembly of Manitoba.

Personal life
Thomas Bunn was born on 16 May 1830 in the Red River Colony to John Bunn, a doctor and councilor, and Catherine Thomas, both Métis. Bunn was educated at the Red River Academy.

In 1854, Bunn moved to the Rural Municipality of St. Andrews and married Isabella Clouston, who died in 1857; the pair had two children. Bunn married again, in 1859, to Rachel Harriot and they had eight children. Two years later, he resettled in Mapleton. He was a farmer throughout his time in the Red River Colony. He was a member of the Church of England and a Freemason. Bunn died on 11 April 1875. A road in St. Andrew's was named after Bunn and his former residence has been declared a provincial heritage site.

Public career
Bunn was a clerk for the Council and Quarterly Court of Assiniboia from 1865 to 1869 and was then appointed to the council on January 1868. He became council's executive officer on 17 December 1869 and remained as such until the council was dissolved in 1870.

Bunn hosted an open-air meeting to hear Donald Alexander Smith, as commissioner of the Canadian government to the Red River Colony, on 19 and 20 January 1870. Following the meeting, a committee was formed to organize the election of a convention to negotiate with the Canadian government. Bunn was named to that committee and, in the subsequent election, was made the English-speaking delegate of the Rural Municipality of St. Clements (now Mapleton) to the Provisional Government of Manitoba. He held that post until 24 June 1870. The convention worked from 27 January to 3 February 1870 and created the Provisional Government, whose head of state, Louis Riel, named Bunn as secretary of state.

Canadian military forces under Colonel Garnet Wolseley reached Fort Garry on 24 August 1870 and deposed the Provisional Government. Bunn survived the fall of the Provisional Government and began studying law. He was elected in December 1870 to the Legislative Assembly of Manitoba in the province's first general election and called to the bar in 1871. Bunn was made a clerk for Manitoba's First General Quarterly Court on 16 May 1871.

References

External links 
 

1830 births
1875 deaths
Members of the Legislative Assembly of Manitoba
Canadian Métis people
Members of the Legislative Assembly of Assiniboia
Métis politicians
Members of the Council of Assiniboia